The Sooner Athletic Conference (SAC) is a college athletic conference affiliated with the National Association of Intercollegiate Athletics (NAIA). Originally developed as a five-team conference of Oklahoma-based schools, the SAC now boasts 12 schools in a league that spans four states – Arkansas, Kansas, Oklahoma and Texas.

As of August 2021, SAC member institutions have collected 109 National Association of Intercollegiate Athletics (NAIA) team championships – the most among NAIA conferences – since the league formed in 1978.

The SAC crowns league champions in 18 intercollegiate sports – nine for women and nine for men. Women's sports are basketball, softball, golf, tennis, cross country, soccer, volleyball, indoor track & field, outdoor track & field, and wrestling. Men's sports are football, basketball, baseball, golf, tennis, cross country, indoor track & field, outdoor track & field, soccer, and wrestling. The newest conference sport is women's wrestling, added for the 2019–20 season.

The conference is known for a rich basketball tradition.  Member schools have won the men's NAIA tournament 12 times and women's NAIA tournament 16 times. SAC member schools also boast 14 NAIA national titles in men's golf, 13 in softball, 12 in women's indoor track and field, 10 in women's golf, 10 in men's cross country, 6 in men's tennis, 5 in women's outdoor track and field, 4 in men's outdoor track and field, 4 in men's indoor track and field, 2 in baseball, 2 in competitive cheer, and 1 in men's soccer for a total of 111.

History

Throughout the league's history, the SAC continues to be known as the conference "Where Champions Play".  Various institutions have competed under the SAC banner over the years. Today only the University of Science and Arts of Oklahoma remains from the original group that was formed when Bethany Nazarene (now Southern Nazarene), Oklahoma Baptist, Oklahoma Christian, and Phillips University withdrew from the Texoma Conference to form the SAC.

Membership has changed over the years with today's current members being admitted as follows: Oklahoma City (1986), Wayland Baptist (1994), John Brown (1995), Mid-America Christian (2007), Southwestern Assemblies of God (2013), Texas Wesleyan (2013), Southwestern Christian (2013), Bacone (2014), Central Christian (2017), Oklahoma Panhandle State (2017), and North Texas–Dallas (2020).

The league also includes associate members on a per-sport basis, with University of Houston–Victoria, University of the Southwest, and University of St. Thomas being part of the SAC in women's golf since 2017. Lyon College has been an associate member for women's wrestling since 2019.

Past members of the SAC include: Oklahoma Baptist, Oklahoma Christian, Southern Nazarene, Rogers State, Lubbock Christian, Northwestern Oklahoma State, Northwood, St. Gregory's and Bacone.

The league also includes associate members on a per-sport basis. Arizona Christian University, Lyon (Ark.) College, Ottawa University-Arizona and Texas College became SAC members for football in 2018-19 with Louisiana College joining for 2021–22.

Chronological timeline
 1978 - The Sooner Athletic Conference (SAC) was founded. Charter members included Bethany Nazarene College (now Southern Nazarene University), Oklahoma Baptist University, Oklahoma Christian University, Phillips University and the University of Science and Arts of Oklahoma (USAO) beginning the 1978-79 academic year.
 1980 - John Brown University joined the Sooner in the 1980-81 academic year.
 1983 - John Brown left the Sooner to become an NAIA Independent after the 1982-83 academic year.
 1986 - Oklahoma City University joined the Sooner in the 1986-87 academic year.
 1994 - USAO left the Sooner to join the Oklahoma Intercollegiate Conference (OIC) after the 1993-94 academic year.
 1994 - Lubbock Christian University and Wayland Baptist University joined the Sooner in the 1994-95 academic year.
 1995 - John Brown re-joined Sooner in the 1995-96 academic year.
 1998 - Phillips left the Sooner as the school announced that it would close after the 1997-98 academic year.
 1999 - St. Gregory's University joined the Sooner in the 1999-2000 academic year.
 2000 - USAO re-joined Sooner in the 2000-01 academic year.
 2002 - Northwestern Oklahoma State University joined the Sooner in the 2002-03 academic year.
 2007 - Mid-America Christian University and Rogers State University joined the Sooner in the 2007-08 academic year.
 2012 - Three institutions left the Sooner and the NAIA to join the Division II ranks of the National Collegiate Athletic Association (NCAA) and to join their respective new home primary conferences: Northwestern Oklahoma State and Southern Nazarene to the Great American Conference (GAC), and Oklahoma Christian to the Heartland Conference after the 2011-12 academic year.
 2013 - Lubbock Christian and Rogers State left the Sooner and joined the NCAA Division II ranks and the Heartland after the 2012-13 academic year.
 2013 - Northwood University–Texas, Southwestern Assemblies of God University, Southwestern Christian University and Texas Wesleyan University joined the Sooner in the 2013-14 academic year.
 2014 - Northwood–Texas left the Sooner as the school announced that it would close after the 2013-14 academic year.
 2015 - Oklahoma Baptist left the Sooner and the NAIA to join the NCAA Division II ranks and the GAC after the 2014-15 academic year.
 2015 - Bacone College joined the Sooner in the 2015-16 academic year.
 2017 - St. Gregory's (Okla.) left the Sooner as the school announced that it would close at the end of the fall 2017 semester during the 2017-18 academic year.
 2017 - Central Christian College of Kansas and Oklahoma Panhandle State University joined the Sooner in the 2017-18 academic year.
 2017 - Five institutions joined the Sooner as associate members: Indiana Institute of Technology (Indiana Tech) and Lourdes University for men's wrestling, while the University of Houston–Victoria, the University of the Southwest and the University of St. Thomas for women's golf, all effective in the 2017-18 academic year.
 2018 - Langston University joined the Sooner in the 2018-19 academic year.
 2018 - Five institutions joined the Sooner as associate members: Arizona Christian University, Lyon College, Ottawa University–Arizona and Texas College for football, and Rochester University for men's wrestling in the 2018-19 academic year.
 2019 - Bacone left the Sooner to become an NAIA Independent as part of the Association of Independent Institutions (AII) after the 2018-19 academic year.
 2019 - St. Thomas (Tex.) left the Sooner as an associate member for women's golf, as the school announced to move up to the NCAA Division III ranks and the Southern Collegiate Athletic Conference (SCAC) after the 2019 spring season (2018-19 academic year).
 2019 - Cleary University joined the Sooner as an associate member for men's wrestling, while Lyon added women's wrestling to its Sooner associate membership, both effective in the 2019-20 academic year.
 2020 - Cleary, Indiana Tech, Lourdes and Rochester left the Sooner as associate members for men's wrestling after the 2019-20 academic year.
 2020 - The University of North Texas at Dallas joined the Sooner as a provisional member for some sports in the 2020-21 academic year.
 2021 - North Texas–Dallas has upgraded to full membership within the Sooner in the 2021-22 academic year.
 2021 - Louisiana College (now Louisiana Christian University) joined the Sooner as an associate member for football in the 2021 fall season (2021-22 academic year).
 2022 - Lyon announced that it will leave the Sooner and the NAIA as an associate member for football to join the NCAA Division III ranks after the 2022 fall season (2022-23 academic year).
 2022 - Arizona Christian announced that it will leave the Sooner as an associate member for football to join the Frontier Conference for that sport after the 2022 fall season (2022-23 academic year).

Member schools

Current members
The Sooner currently has 12 full members, all but four are private schools:

Notes

Associate members
The Sooner currently has seven associate members, all but one are private schools:

Notes

Former members
The Sooner had ten former full members, all but two were private schools:

Notes

Former associate members
The Sooner had five former associate members, all were private schools:

Notes

Membership timeline

References

External links